Here at the Home is the debut album from the Boston, MA alternative band Tribe. The album was released on March 16, 1990 (see 1990 in music) and was produced by the band themselves.

A single for "Jakpot" was released, containing a dance mix of the song.

The cassette tape version of the album included only the first six tracks. The last four tracks ("Abort", "Pinwheels", "Vigil", "Lemmings") were previously released in 1987 on their self-titled debut E.P., Tribe.

"Outside" is featured as a playable track on the disc of Rock Band.

Track listing

Personnel
 Janet LaValley: vocals, rhythm guitar
 Terri Barous: keyboard, backing vocals
 Eric Brosius: lead guitar, backing vocals
 Greg LoPiccolo: bass, backing vocals
 David Penzo: drums, percussion

References 

1990 debut albums
Tribe (band) albums